Feldis/Veulden is a village in the municipality of Tomils in the district of Hinterrhein in the Swiss canton of Graubünden.  In 2009 Scheid merged with Feldis/Veulden, Trans and Tumegl/Tomils to form the municipality of Tomils.

History
Feldis/Veulden is first mentioned around 1290-98 as Felden.

Geography

Of this area, 35.4% is used for agricultural purposes, while 57.1% is forested. Of the rest of the land, 1.8% is settled (buildings or roads) and the remainder (5.7%) is non-productive (rivers, glaciers or mountains).

The municipality is located in the Domleschg sub-district of the Hinterrhein district. Until 1943 Feldis/Veulden was known as Feldis.

Demographics
Feldis/Veulden has a population of 140, of which 8.6% are foreign nationals.  Over the last 10 years the population has grown at a rate of 0.7%.

, the gender distribution of the population was 42.9% male and 57.1% female.  The age distribution, in Feldis/Veulden is; 14 people or 10.9% of the population are between 0 and 9 years old.  16 people or 12.4% are 10 to 14, and 6 people or 4.7% are 15 to 19.  Of the adult population, 6 people or 4.7% of the population are between 20 and 29 years old.  9 people or 7.0% are 30 to 39, 32 people or 24.8% are 40 to 49, and 13 people or 10.1% are 50 to 59.  The senior population distribution is 12 people or 9.3% of the population are between 60 and 69 years old, 16 people or 12.4% are 70 to 79, there are 4 people or 3.1% who are 80 to 89, and there are 1 people or 0.8% who are 90 to 99.

In the 2007 federal election the most popular party was the SPS which received 41.7% of the vote.  The next three most popular parties were the SVP (36.5%), the FDP (15.3%) and the CVP (5.2%).

The entire Swiss population is generally well educated.  In Feldis/Veulden about 80.7% of the population (between age 25-64) have completed either non-mandatory upper secondary education or additional higher education (either University or a Fachhochschule).

Feldis/Veulden has an unemployment rate of 0.66%.  , there were 16 people employed in the primary economic sector and about 8 businesses involved in this sector.  3 people are employed in the secondary sector and there is 1 business in this sector.  31 people are employed in the tertiary sector, with 9 businesses in this sector.

The historical population is given in the following table:

Languages
Since 1900, there has been a rapid shift from Romansh to German.
Today, the municipality is predominantly German-speaking, with a small Romansh minority.  , 85.3% of the population speaks German, with Romansh being second most common (14.0%) and French being third ( 0.8%).

References

External links
 Official Web site 

Ski areas and resorts in Switzerland
Former municipalities of Graubünden
Domleschg